The following is a list of Kenya women's national rugby union team matches.

Overall 
Kenya's overall international match record against all nations, updated to 2 November 2022, is as follows:

Full internationals

2000s

2010s

2020s

Other matches

References 

Kenya